Poco: The Songs of Paul Cotton is a compilation album consisting of songs by Paul Cotton of the band Poco, released in 1979.

Track listing
All songs by Paul Cotton
"Bad Weather" – 5:02
"One Horse Blue" – 3:34
"Western Waterloo'" – 4:00
"Faith In The Families"– 3:43
"Angel" – 4:55
"Blue Water" – 3:07
"A Right Along" – 4:43
"Ride The Country" – 6:25
"Keeper Of The Fire" – 4:20
"Railroad Days" – 3:35

Personnel
Richie Furay - guitar, 12-string guitar, vocals
Rusty Young - steel guitar, banjo, dobro, guitar, piano
George Grantham - drums, vocals
Timothy B. Schmit - bass, vocals
Paul Cotton - guitar, vocals

References

Poco compilation albums
1979 compilation albums
Epic Records compilation albums